The Central Bank of Iceland is the central bank or reserve bank of Iceland. It has served in this capacity since 1961, when it was created by an act of the Alþingi out of the central banking department of Landsbanki Íslands, which had the sole right of note issuance since 1927 and had conducted only limited monetary policy.

Seðlabanki Íslands is owned by the Icelandic government, and is administered by a governor and a seven-member supervisory board, elected by the country's parliament following each general election. It has the sole right to issue notes and coins of Icelandic krónur and to manage the state's foreign currency reserves. The Central Bank Act of 1986 eliminated the ability of the Central Bank to regulate the interest rates of commercial banks and savings banks.

Though nominally independent, the Central Bank of Iceland was historically expected to follow the lead of the central government. In 2001, however, a floating exchange rate policy was introduced and since then the Central Bank has been empowered to adopt an inflation target and manage monetary policy so as to achieve price stability independent of the policies of the central government.

Governors

Monetary reform 

In 2015, after the 2008–2011 Icelandic financial crisis, the government of Iceland considered "a revolutionary monetary proposal" to abolish private money creation and to end to fractional-reserve banking. Similar to the Swiss Sovereign Money Initiative, this plan would remove the power of money creation from the commercial banks and give it to the Central Bank of Iceland.

See also
2008–2011 Icelandic financial crisis
Economy of Iceland
Financial Supervisory Authority
Icelandic króna
Glitnir
Kaupthing Bank
Landsbanki

References

External links
 Official website  
 Official website 

Iceland
Banks of Iceland
Banking in Iceland
Banks established in 1961
1961 establishments in Iceland
Government agencies of Iceland